Alien Nation: Body and Soul (original airdate: October 10, 1995) was the second television movie produced to continue the story after the cancellation of the Alien Nation television series. In this series (itself a spinoff of the 1988 film with James Caan), human Los Angeles Police Department Detective Matthew Sykes (Gary Graham) and his alien partner George Francisco (Eric Pierpoint) investigate crimes related to the Tenctonese, a race of aliens that have become stranded on earth.

Alien Nation: Body and Soul was written by Andrew Schneider, Diane Frolov, Renee & Harry Longstreet (previously novelized by Peter David), and was directed by Kenneth Johnson. In the film, Detective Matthew Sikes and his partner must investigate a scientist who is crossbreeding humans and Tenctonese.

Plot
It follows the television series format of two parallel storylines.  The first plot is about a seemingly human-Tenctonese hybrid child involved in a sinister experiment with a Newcomer (a euphemism for Tenctonese) scientist disguised as a human.  The subplot is the budding relationship between Matt Sikes and his Tenctonese neighbor, Dr. Cathy Frankel.  The relationship between Matt and Cathy was an ongoing theme of the Alien Nation television series.

Cast

Main cast

Additional cast

Reception
The film's makeup artists were nominated for a Primetime Emmy for "Outstanding Makeup for a Miniseries or a Special." The nominees were Rick Stratton, Richard Snell, David Abbott, Craig Reardon, Steve LaPorte, Janna Phillips, Kenny Myers, and Jill Rockow.

See also

References

External links
 

American science fiction television films
Body and Soul
1995 television films
1995 films
Television sequel films
Television series reunion films
Television films based on television series
20th Century Fox Television films
Films directed by Kenneth Johnson (producer)
1990s American films